Tarbinskiellus portentosus is the type species of cricket in its Asian genus, which belongs to the tribe Gryllini.  This species has been recorded from India, China, Indochina and Malesia; it is called Gangsir in Indonesia.  Placed in the subtribe Brachytrupina, for many years this cricket was included in the African genus Brachytrupes, due to the relative size and shape its head.

Gallery

References

External links
 
 

Gryllinae
Orthoptera of Asia
Orthoptera of Indo-China
Taxa named by Anton August Heinrich Lichtenstein